Azzam Alwash (1958; in Arabic: عزام علواش ʻAzām ʻAlwāš) is an Iraqi hydraulic engineer and environmentalist. He was awarded the Goldman Environmental Prize in 2013, in particular for his efforts on restoring salt marshes in southern Iraq that had been destroyed during the Saddam Hussein regime.

Alwash left Iraq in 1978 at the age of 20 because he refused to join the ruling Ba'ath Party. Halfway through an engineering degree, Alwash moved to Los Angeles, California and continued his studies. Following the 2003 invasion, Alwash returned to Iraq and set up a non-profit, Nature Iraq, to focus on restoring the salt marshes of southern Iraq.

References 

1958 births
Living people
Iraqi engineers
Iraqi environmentalists
Iraqi refugees
Iraqi expatriates in the United States
Goldman Environmental Prize awardees